Robert Mammone (born 1969) is an Australian actor. He is known for his role as AK in The Matrix movies, as Sid Walker in the soap opera Home and Away, and as Tim Palmer in Sons and Daughters. He was also the main villain to former WWE wrestler Stone Cold Steve Austin in the WWE Films action movie The Condemned and portrayed Carlos "Charlie" Nash in Street Fighter, opposite Jean-Claude Van Damme and Raul Julia.

He is best known for his portrayal of convicted drug baron Tony Mokbel in the Australian television show Underbelly and its sequels, Fat Tony & Co and Informer 3838.

Filmography
 Sons and Daughters (1984–1985, TV Series) as Tim Palmer
 All the Way (1988, TV Mini-Series) as Mr. Bianchi
 Luigi's Ladies (1989) as Tony
 Embassy (1990, TV Series) as Rashid
 The Crossing (1990) as Sam
 Police Rescue (1992, TV Series) as Truck Driver
 Time Trax (1993, TV Series) as Zack Elliott
 Street Fighter (1994) as Carlos "Charlie" Blanka
 Cody (1994–1996, TV Movie) as Fiorelli
 Bordertown (1995, TV Mini-Series) as Cesare
 Flipper (1995, TV Series)
 Offspring (1996) as Ben / Carlo
 McLeod's Daughters (1996, TV Movie) as Patrick Devlin
 The Beast (1996, TV Mini-Series) as Ensign Raines
 Heaven's Burning (1997) as Mahood
 Wanted (1997) as Su-Ming
 Good Guys Bad Guys (1998, TV Series) as Cosimo Mazzini
 Wildside (1998, TV Series) as Jimmy Jago
 Never Tell Me Never (1998, TV Movie) as Dr Adrian Cohen
 Spank! (1999) as Paulie
 Stingers (1999, TV Series) as Dino Rossi
 Vertical Limit (2000) as Brian Maki
 Blue Heelers (2000, TV Series) as Bernie O'Halloran
 Water Rats (2001, TV Series) as Detective Agi Fatseas
 Jet Set (2001) as Frank
 Outriders (2001, TV Series) as Fenech
 Echo (2001) as Edouard
 The Lost World (2002, TV Series) as Professor Campbell
 BeastMaster (2002, TV Series) as Arnath
 The Matrix Reloaded (2003) as AK
 The Pact (2003) as Wilga Roberts
 The Matrix Revolutions (2003) as AK
 Small Claims (2004, TV Movie) as Todd Fehlers
 Salem's Lot (2004 Mini-Series) as Dr.James Cody
 The Cooks (2004–2005, TV Series) as Michael
 Man-Thing (2005) as Mike Ploog
 The Great Raid (2005) as Captain Fisher
 The Alice (2005-2006, TV Series) as Simon Westlake
 The Caterpillar Wish (2006) as Stephen Knight
 BlackJack (2006, TV Movie) as Tom Lyndon
 Dangerous (2007, TV Series) as Craig Lukovic
 The Condemned (2007) as Ian "Breck" Breckel
 Satisfaction (2007–2008, TV Series) as Nick
 Underbelly (2008) as Tony Mokbel
 Carla Cametti PD (2009, TV Series) as Tony Cametti
 Neighbours (2009, TV Series) as Phil Andrews
 Storage (2009) as Francis
 Home and Away (2009-2013, TV Series) as Sid Walker
 Arctic Blast (2010) as Charlie Barker
 The Dragon Pearl (2011) as Philip Dukas
 Swerve (2011) as Logan
 Mystery Road (2013) as Constable Roberts
 Fat Tony & Co (2014, TV Series) as Tony Mokbel
 The Water Diviner (2014) as Colonel Demergelis
 Miss Fisher's Murder Mysteries (2015, TV Series) as Guido Lupinacci
 Brock (2016, TV Mini-Series) as Eric 'Rick' Dowker
 Janet King (2017, TV Series) as Darren Faulkes
 Bite Club (2018, TV Series) as Jim Russo
 Informer 3838 (2020, TV Series) as Tony Mokbel

References

External links
 

1971 births
Living people
Australian male film actors
Australian male television actors
Male actors from Adelaide